Brita Catharina Lidbeck, also Brita Catharina Munck af Rosenschöld (1788 – 2 March 1864) was a Swedish Dilettante concert singer. She was a member of the Royal Swedish Academy of Music.

She was the daughter of Petrus Munck af Rosenschöld, bishop in Lund. She married Anders Lidbeck, professor in Lund, in 1817.  She was a student of the opera singer Karl Magnus Craelius, and made her public debut at a concert arranged by him in Stockholm in 1813.  Brita Catharina Lidbeck was a non-professional concert singer.  She performed at charity concerts and in musical societies.  She was inducted to the Royal Swedish Academy of Music in 1827. She performed in public for the last time in a charity concert to the benefit of the students of the Royal Academy of Music on 6 March 1842. Singers from the royal academy performed at her funeral.

See also 
 Anna Brita Wendelius
 Christina Fredenheim

Sources 
 Lidbeck, Brita Catharina i Arvid Ahnfelt, Europas konstnärer (1887)
 Crustenstolpe, Magnus. ”Brita Catharina Lidbeck [nekrolog]". Svea Folk-kalender (1865): sid. 130–132. Libris 2105141
 Gustaf Hilleström: Kungl. Musikaliska Akademien, Matrikel 1771-1971
 Lidbeck, Brita Catharina i Wilhelmina Stålberg, Anteckningar om svenska qvinnor (1864)

References

19th-century Swedish women singers
1788 births
Members of the Royal Swedish Academy of Music
1864 deaths